Marshall T. Heaps (died August 7, 1961) was an American politician, farmer and businessman from Maryland. He served as a member of the Maryland House of Delegates, representing Harford County, from 1927 to 1933 and from 1939 to 1943.

Career
Heaps was a Democrat. He served as a member of the Maryland House of Delegates, representing Harford County, from 1927 to 1933 and from 1939 to 1943.

Heaps owned several farms in Harford County. He operated Heaps Motor Company, a Ford automobile agency in Cardiff, Maryland, for 42 years.

Personal life
Heaps was married to Helen A. He had a son and daughter, Marshall T. Jr. and Eleanor. He was a member, trustee and supervisor of sunday school at Slate Ridge Presbyterian Church.

Heaps died on August 7, 1961, at the age of 62, at Union Memorial Hospital in Baltimore. He was buried at Slate Ridge Cemetery in Cardiff.

References

Year of birth missing
1890s births
1961 deaths
People from Cardiff, Maryland
Democratic Party members of the Maryland House of Delegates
Presbyterians from Maryland
Farmers from Maryland
Automotive businesspeople
20th-century American businesspeople
20th-century American politicians